Manduca andicola is a moth of the family Sphingidae first described by Walter Rothschild and Karl Jordan in 1916. It is found from Central America to Peru, Ecuador, Bolivia and Argentina.

It is similar to Manduca lefeburii, Manduca incisa and Manduca jasminearum in having a relatively uniform forewing upperside with a conspicuous, rather diffuse dark band running from about midway along the costa to the outer margin and incorporating the discal spot.

References

Manduca
Moths described in 1916
Taxa named by Walter Rothschild
Taxa named by Karl Jordan